ProntoForms (TSXV: PFM) is a Canadian app development business providing a low-code development platform for the construction of software and mobile apps. The application digitizes paperwork to complete forms on mobile devices, collect data, and send it. The company went public in 2005 and trades on the TSX Venture Exchange under the stock ticker symbol, PFM.

History
ProntoForms was founded in 2001 in Ottawa, Canada as TrueContext Mobile Solutions by CEO Alvaro Pombo. 

In 2007, the company launched its Pronto app in the United States for BlackBerry and Windows Mobile devices. Later, the app extended its support to Android and iOS devices. 

In 2013, the company officially changed its name to ProntoForms. 

In 2019, ProntoForms was recognized in the 2019 Gartner "Magic Quadrant for Enterprise Low-Code Application Platforms" as one of 18 LCAP software vendors.

Products
ProntoForms' flagship product is a low-code mobile app and software for field workers and technicians to collect, send, and receive data using mobile devices.

The platform consists of an app and a drag-and-drop form builder. Integrations that transmit data to back-end and cloud systems and existing field service management software are also connected via a drag-and-drop interface.

Apps made with this platform are mainly used for field service. Dispatching and automatic notifications can also be included. Collected data can be exported to formats like PDF, CSV, Excel, and raw data files. After data is gathered, real-time dashboards and reports can be generated.

Common use cases for ProntoForms include environmental, health & safety inspections, asset management, audits, delivery dispatch coordination, tracking time on service calls, and others.

Partnerships 
In 2007, the firm entered into a partnership with AT&T that made the telecommunications company a distributor of the ProntoForms software. Other partnerships that ProntoForms formed included Nextel, Rogers, and Bell.

In 2015, it established a partnership with Apple, which assisted in the distribution of its technology.

In 2019, ProntoForms announced a partnership with ServicePower, a Field Service Management (FSM) software company.

Awards 
In 2015, Frost & Sullivan honored ProntoForms with the "North American Mobile Forms Competitive Strategy Innovation and Leadership" Award.

References

Companies listed on the TSX Venture Exchange
Companies established in 2001
Companies based in Ottawa
Software companies of Canada